= Neenah, Virginia =

Unincorporated community in Virginia, US

Coordinates: 38°02′54″N 76°43′14″W

Neenah is an unincorporated community in Westmoreland County, in the U. S. state of Virginia.

== History ==
A post office called Neenah was established in 1900, and remained in operation until it was discontinued in 1958. Neenah is a name derived from a Native American language meaning "pure". On USGS Topographical Maps from 1892 through 1901 (e.g. Piney Pt, MD 1892 and Nomini, MD 1901), the name of this town is shown as Warrensville. The Machadoc, VA topopgraphical map of 1943 indicates Neenah as the place name. Warrensville is listed one of several voting precincts in the area along with other place names that exist today, including Hague, Montross, and Oldhams
